I criminali della metropoli (a.k.a. Fango sulla metropoli ) is a 1965 Italian crime film written and directed by "Henry Wilson" (Gino Mangini).

Plot

Cast
Tony Kendall	 as Sgt. Perier
Dorian Gray as Denise
Vassili Karis	 as Pierre (credited as Marco Vassilli)
Greta Polyn	 as Zizi
Enzo Tarascio	 as Brigadiere Lemaire
Maddalena Gillia	 as Annette
Germano Longo	 as Henry Delange (credited as James Harridon)
Giancarlo Giannini  as Gerard Lemaire
Silla Bettini	 as Chabrol 
Roger Beaumont as Inspector Blanchard
Claudio Biava	 as Alfred
Calisto Calisti	 as René Baron
Angelo Dessy	 as Victor Leduc
Attilio Dottesio	 as Jordan
Gianni Solaro	 as Chief Inspector Brasseur
Nino Marchetti

References

External links
 

1965 films
1960s Italian-language films
Italian crime films
1965 crime films
1960s Italian films